Alliant Credit Union is a member-owned financial cooperative headquartered in Chicago, Illinois. Alliant services employees, retirees, and members of qualifying organizations and their family members; any member of the Foster Care to Success; and individuals who live or work in a qualifying community and their family members. Founded in 1935, Alliant is the ninth largest credit union by asset size in the United States with $14 billion USD in assets, and serves more than 600,000 members nationwide.

History
On October 26, 1935, a small group of United Airlines employees organized a credit union. The credit union was founded as United Airlines Employees' Credit Union (UAECU), but in 2003, the name was changed to Alliant Credit Union. After 68 years as a single-sponsor credit union, the credit union diversified membership and by the end of 2003, offered services to 27 sponsor organizations and to individuals who lived and worked in 19 communities around O'Hare International Airport. Today, Alliant Credit Union offers membership to over 150 organizations and continues to offer services to communities around O'Hare International Airport.

Mergers and acquisitions
In 2008, Alliant Credit Union acquired Kaiperm Federal Credit Union of Oakland, California.

In 2011, the credit union merged with Continental Federal Credit Union of Tempe, Arizona, including its separately branded US Airways Credit Union.

Regulatory oversight and deposit insurance
Alliant Credit Union is an Illinois chartered credit union, and is under the supervision of the Illinois Department of Financial and Professional Regulation (IDFPR)and the Consumer Financial Protection Bureau (CFPB). Alliant Credit Union's share savings accounts are insured by the National Credit Union Administration (NCUA), an independent agency of the federal government, which administers the National Credit Union Share Insurance Fund (NCUSIF). The NCUA and IDFPR conduct periodic examinations of Alliant.

Membership
Alliant Credit Union membership is a benefit available to individuals who meet one of the following eligibility requirements:

 Any employee or member of a qualifying organization.
 A person that lives, works, or worships in a qualifying Chicago area community.
 Any member of Foster Care to Success.
 Any person related to by blood or law to an existing Alliant member.
 Any domestic partners of unmarried members.

Products and services
Alliant Credit Union's product line includes savings accounts, checking accounts, certificates, IRAs, consumer loans, and Visa credit cards. An Alliant savings account establishes membership with Alliant Credit Union and the initial savings deposit is $5. The savings account options are Regular Savings, Supplemental Savings, Custodial Savings, and Kidz Klub for youngsters under 12 years of age. To receive monthly dividends the savings account requires an average daily balance of $100 or more. Alliant's checking is free with the first set of checks being free and opting out of paper statements, and having at least one monthly electronic deposit is required for the high rate checking option. Consumer loans include mortgages and vehicle and personal loans. Alliant also offers investment services and insurance. Alliant offered Health Savings Accounts, until 2017, when it sold the accounts to Health Equity.

Account access
Alliant's services include Alliant online banking, free bill pay, mobile deposit, ATM deposit, eDeposit, and eDepositPlus. eDeposit gives qualified Alliant members the ability to make deposits online before mailing the actual checks in special eDeposit envelopes to the credit union. eDepositPlus allows members to remotely deposit checks using a home scanner.

Currently, Alliant has a 24/7 member contact center and over 80,000 surcharge-free ATMs located around the world.

Alliant Credit Union Foundation
The Alliant Credit Union Foundation is a separate, independent legal entity, incorporated in Illinois and operated by a Board of Directors composed of Alliant Credit Union employees. The Foundation is a not-for-profit charitable foundation established to promote economic empowerment and self-sufficiency in communities where Alliant Credit Union members and employees live and work. Specific types of support that will be provided include: education, service, grants and investments.
 
In 2010, the Alliant Credit Union Foundation completed its first year of operations. During that year, the Foundation donated $200,000 to worthy causes. Causes eligible for Foundation financial support were those in line with its mission.

References

External links
 
 

Credit unions based in Illinois
Banks established in 1935
Companies based in Chicago
1935 establishments in Illinois